Hot Car Girl is a 1958 American film directed by Bernard L. Kowalski. Seeing Hot Car Girl in a four-walled playoff in 1958 gave the audience the sense that they were witnessing something clandestine and taboo.

It was an early credit for producer Gene Corman, who said "It had a very modest budget... but it served us well."

Plot
Duke and Freddie are two friends who steal car parts and pawn them for support. Duke's girlfriend Peg attempts to dissuade him from this lifestyle. Angered, he taunts her with another girl, Janice, who has driven up alongside him. They line up for a drag race. A motorcycle policeman who chases them is killed as he crashes into Janice's car.  Janice gets arrested.  Duke, who has driven off, paints his black car light blue to escape detection. Janice learns his license number, and, in fear of being discovered, Duke kills her. Duke coerces Peg to leave town with him.  They go on the run as thieves.  Realizing his luck will not hold out but unwilling to surrender, Duke sends Peg back.  Duke remains alone in an abandoned roadside market, awaiting his fate.

Cast
 Richard Bakalyan as Walter 'Duke' Willis
 June Kenney as Margaret 'Peg' Dale
 Robert Knapp as Det. Lt. Ryan
 John Brinkley as Freddy
 Sheila McKay as Micki
 Bruno Vesota as Joe Doobie
 Jana Lund as Janice Wheeler
 Grace Albertson as Mrs. Dale
 Hal Smith as Lon - Soda Bar Owner
 Tyler McVey as Mr. James Wheeler
 Howard Culver as Dan - Police Headquarters Sergeant
 Jack Lambert as Cop # 1 at Soda Bar
 Ed Nelson as Second Cop at Soda Bar - Driver

References

1958 films
Films directed by Bernard L. Kowalski
Films produced by Gene Corman
1958 drama films
1950s English-language films
Allied Artists films
American auto racing films
1950s American films
1958 directorial debut films